Ham Sang-myeong (born 10 November 1995) is a South Korean boxer. He competed in the men's bantamweight event at the 2016 Summer Olympics.

References

External links
 

1995 births
Living people
People from Gyeonggi Province
Sportspeople from Gyeonggi Province
People from Siheung
South Korean male boxers
Olympic boxers of South Korea
Boxers at the 2016 Summer Olympics
Place of birth missing (living people)
Asian Games medalists in boxing
Asian Games gold medalists for South Korea
Boxers at the 2014 Asian Games
Medalists at the 2014 Asian Games
Bantamweight boxers